Septmonts is a commune in the Aisne department in Hauts-de-France in northern France.

Population

Donjon de Septmonts

In the heart of the village lies the remains of the Château de Septmonts, of which the principal remains are of the 14th century donjon or keep. The castle was the country seat of the Bishop of Soissons, probably since the last half of the 12th century and was first built in stone a little before 1242.

Thought to have been inspired by the works of Charles V of France, the 43 metre tall donjon, exemplifies the princely style of the late 14th century, combining both military and residential function.

The donjon is currently undergoing a programme of restoration. The other sights at the chateau include:

 Ditches and walls
 Remains of the Salle St. Louis (13th century hall)
 Remains of the Renaissance bishop's palace
 Verger and Arboretum de Septmonts

Saint-André de Septmonts church
The village contains a fifteenth-century church in the flamboyant style.

See also
 Communes of the Aisne department

References

Communes of Aisne
Aisne communes articles needing translation from French Wikipedia